Reigning champion Laurence Doherty defeated Frank Riseley 6–4, 4–6, 6–2, 6–3 in the challenge round to win the gentlemen's singles tennis title at the 1906 Wimbledon Championships. Riseley had defeated Arthur Gore in the All Comers' Final.

Draw

Challenge round

All comers' finals

Top half

Section 1

Section 2

Section 3

Section 4

Bottom half

Section 5

Section 6

Section 7

Section 8

References

External links

Men's Singles
Wimbledon Championship by year – Men's singles